Oliver Fiechter (born April 30, 1972) is a Swiss economic philosopher, digital business model innovatonist, management visionaire, entrepreneur, and author of the books We Are The Economy! (2012) and Rise of the Digital Tribal Society (2016).

In his 2012 book, he describes an economic philosophy of ‘Economy 3.0’ as a principle of need satisfaction and a new way of working together that reflects this fundamental change. Economy 3.0 is an economy that is decentrally controlled by people. Put simply, Economy 1.0 can be described as agriculture. The Economy 2.0 is the industrial society and Economy 3.0 is the service society. Each economy level includes shares of the others. The significant difference is this: Economy 2.0 was about eliminating scarcity. In Economics 3.0, the goal is to deal with the abundance. Fiechter has the vision of a future global economic and social order, defined by a transparent digital barter society, based on reciprocity, equality, and cooperation instead of competition. 
Based on the ‘Economy 3.0’ theory Fiechter invented a management-, strategy- and controlling-methodology for human-centered corporate management. Furthermore, Fiechter is the founder of the ISG Institute in St. Gallen and General Director of M&H Equity AG, an private equity investment company that operates internationally and with a unique methodology that can identify risks and potentials in companies based on the soft factors.

For the Carlo Foundation, by the Liechtenstein government, he developed a rating approach for the sustainable rating and valuation of financial products. On behalf of the Austrian Chamber of Commerce, he developed the hidden champion 3.0 award, which rates export-oriented companies according to the rating criteria of the economy 3.0. Fiechter has been involved with his project Peerworld of the Clinton Global Initiative since 2016.

Early life

Fiechter was born in Buenos Aires, Argentina on April 30, 1972. He is the son of Beat Fiechter, Ursula Fiechter. He has a sister Natalia born 1976. In the early eighties, Fiechter and his family fled Argentina because of the threat by the Argentinian putschists. The family returned to Switzerland. Integrating into Swiss schooling and culture was difficult for Fiechter, and he began to distrust authorities categorically. Fiechter's negative experiences with institutionalized education influenced his interest in Adaptive Learning, as stated in his book; We Are The Economy! (2012). In it, Fiechter advocates individualized lifelong learning that “develops constructive critical thinking and individual development.” Fiechter is opposed to factory-like, mass training without regard for the individual. He states that in order to adapt to the changing digitalization of the world, education will have to shift away from standardization and towards fostering individual creativity and innovation.

Career

Fiechter's beliefs are strongly influenced by constructionist philosophies, particularly Heinz von Foerster's work on self-organizing systems. Fiechter's core interests lie in the relationships and social exchanges that take place while the needs of the stakeholders within the system are being satisfied.
In 2008 Fiechter founded the ISG Institute in St. Gallen, a Swiss-based think-tank known for developing methodology and tools (based on empirical research) that enable companies to measure and report on “soft factors” and individual preferences such as values, ideals, psychological motivations and attitudes of customers, employees, management and other stakeholders. The methodologies see companies as complex social organizations; and thus integrate intangible nonfinancial assets with traditional financial assets in valuation analysis. Companies can therefore measure and report (in real time) how soft factors impact financial performance. PricewaterhouseCoopers (PwC) and Ernst & Young (EY), have adopted Fiechter's tools as part of their client solutions. The ‘Hidden Champion 3.0 Award’ of the Austrian Ministry of Commerce is based on this methodology (see Hidden Champions). In 2009, the Swiss economist and winner of the Swiss Innovation Prize (1983)  Prof. Dr. Cuno Pümpin partnered with the ISG Institute. The collaboration proved that management makes more sound and objective decisions when implementing ISG-methodology (including qualitative and quantitative facts).

Fiechter's belief in the “Stakeholder Value Management” approach (versus the “Financial Value Management”) is the basis for his Economy 3.0 philosophy. In the Economy 3.0 the purpose of a company or organization is to produce value for every stakeholder involved—customers, employees, shareholders, suppliers, local communities, even the society at large. In contrast, the “Shareholder Value Movement” focuses solely on maximizing profits and maximizing the value of a company for certain stakeholders. In Fiechter's opinion, the Shareholder Value movement contributed substantially to the 2008 world financial crisis. He believes that the shareholder value movement has reached its limits and that advancing communication technologies, digitalization and the emergence of peer-to-peer networks can shift the balance of power towards individuals. He foresees a new economic order wherein networks of clients and stakeholders collaborate and co-create for the betterment of society.

Economy 1.0 and 2.0

Economy 3.0 is a new economic system that is described in the book ‘We are the Economy!’ by Oliver Fiechter. In cooperation with tech entrepreneurs, politicians and artists, Oliver Fiechter had developed 33 theses which later constituted the basis of that book. In order to understand Economy 3.0, one needs to understand the economic systems that preceded it, as well as the key differences between Economies 1.0, 2.0 and 3.0.

Economy 1.0 is the first economic system that is based on money. It marks the beginning of large scale industry and its goal is dealing with the fundamental problem of physical scarcity. Basic needs like food, water and clothing have to be satisfied. The demand is significantly higher than the supply, so the size of the market is determined by the supply side, which mainly consists of small businesses that focus on satisfying local needs. The driving force of Economy 1.0 is development and the system is controlled by the state.

Economy 2.0 is not just about survival anymore; its participants are longing for material wealth. An increase in efficiency leads to more supply, which brings supply and demand into alignment and therefore increases the power of the consumer. The average size of enterprises increases – which is one of the reasons for increased efficiency – and enterprise management is concentrated in the hands of a few. Furthermore, the realization of the ego becomes the driving force of the system; the individual wants to be unique. Since the needs of the customers are more or less equal, whether or not a need can be satisfied depends on the financial possibilities of the individual. In this economy, success is assessed through profit, respectively the lack thereof.

Economy 3.0

“The imperative of Economy 3.0 is called intellectualization, this means that a community is to empower its members to reflexive thinking and acting.” In Economy 3.0, the third sector – the service sector – dominates. There is an abundance of physical and material goods, which is why the exchange of intangibles in order to increase intangible prosperity becomes the primary focus of the system. The demand for efficiency and size is replaced by a demand for creativity and empathy. Intangible needs are highly individual and cannot be satisfied through mass production. In order to fulfill a customer need, an enterprise needs to know what exactly the need is and how it can be fulfilled. The gap between producer and consumer shrinks; the consumer turns into a co-producer. New forms of relationships between organizations and stakeholders are required, the interaction becomes more important than the transaction. Digitalization leads to a new kind of knowledge society because the internet makes it possible for everyone to contribute and access knowledge.

“The basis of the new creation of the economy is through dematerialization.” Dematerialization changes the needs as well as the means to satisfy the needs. The physical world is losing importance, whereas the non-physical world is becoming more and more relevant; the material world is turning into an intangible world.

Corporate management in Economy 3.0 works according to the principles of self-organization. The metaphor of the swarm can be used to explain these principles. “Swarms function without central control, solely by the cooperation of individual agents that interact loyally with each other and are equal to each other.” A swarm forms, whenever a group of people pursues the same task. Successful swarms require a commitment to self-organization, indirect cooperation, access to a wide variety of knowledge and it has to be able to adapt to changing environmental conditions. Since there is no one giving instructions, tools like knowledge competitions – where different approaches are compared and assessed – need to be used to increase the quality of decisions.

When enterprises function according to the swarm principle, this leads to a decentralization of management, which leads to a new, more equal distribution of power. As beneficial as the swarm principle may seem, there is one thing that needs to be taken into consideration: the so-called knowledge paradox. More available knowledge leads to better processes due to better information. However, having knowledge that no one else has means having power, which incentivizes individuals to keep knowledge to themselves. The knowledge paradox arises due to lack of knowledge about the behavior of others. Communicative integration and information transparency can help to avoid it.

The characteristics of Economy 3.0 are transparency, digitality and reciprocity. Like any new system, it has new rules and creates new winners and losers. Five new rules that can be derived are that one needs to self-reflect and network. Additionally, one needs to be transparent, offer dematerialized value and take part in the new, decentralized control possibilities.
The winners of Economy 3.0 can be separated into two categories: the digital and the creative. Who the digital are is quite self-explanatory; due to digitalization, the distances between two countries is virtually nonexistent. The world is designated as flat and individuals are separated into different segments on the internet according to their identity. The digital are the ones who are able to cope with this and use it to their advantage. The creative are able to interpret and reinterpret knowledge, products, processes and systems. They think critically and question existing conditions and premises. Closely related to the creative are people with high human capital. Their main task is storing and managing knowledge. They understand, collect and document existing knowledge. People with high human capital have received a high formal education and collaborating with them is desirable for others.

The losers of Economy 3.0 are difficult to determine. Whether the winners of Economy 2.0 constitute the losers of 3.0 depends on their focus and whether or not they accept the change. The most apparent thing the winners of Economy 2.0 are going to want to focus on is trying to hold on to the old system. “The winners of Economy 2.0 will use their weapons so that the old power relations remain alive. This is achieved by the old system remaining alive, the old conventions being declared as irreversible and the previous central control mechanisms being maintained.” However, if they master the rules of Economy 3.0 or if they are able to manipulate their weapons so that the rules of Economy 2.0 still lead to success, they may become winners of Economy 3.0.

Education of Economy 2.0 works according to the key principle of its economy: efficiency. It can be compared to a trivial process; input is offered and a clear output is expected; the individuality of the learners is ignored.
Future educational systems should be systems that accompany people over their entire lives and embrace the individuality of those learning. They should allow creativity and unpredictability; strengths should be discovered and promoted. “As a result of modified education, people become less able to be influenced, less able to be manipulated, less able to be controlled from the outside.”

Measuring systems of today, most importantly GDP, measure success according to the principles and goals of Economy 2.0. In new economic systems, we need new indicators to evaluate the prosperity and well-being of states. Instead of only measuring quantitative indicators like financial profit, emotional indicators like the happiness and the health of a society should be integrated into our calculations of success.

Instead of calling it Economy 4.0, ‘We are the Economy!’ refers to the economy following Economy 3.0 as Synchronomy. Synchronomy is a neologism made up of synchronization and economy. This new system overcomes the logic of scarcity; it is replaced by the logic of abundance. The tangible needs are already satisfied; the system is entirely devoted to the intangible. Enterprises only exist as synchronization platforms where people who produce certain benefits and people who want to receive those benefits meet and form ‘communities’. A community dissolves, once the particular need is satisfied. In Synchronomy, the features of the markets that are characteristic in Economy 3.0 – virtuality, transparency and reciprocity – gain importance. Dematerialization continues, the principle of exchange and ‘interaction instead of transaction’ are in the foreground. Hierarchies are replaced by networks. There is a complete decentralization of the structure, development and management of enterprises; they are fully in the hands of the stakeholders. Instead of having executives, communities rely on direct communication and swarm intelligence.

The central task of the dematerialized enterprises in Synchronomy is to act as knowledge centers that store, develop and redistribute knowledge. Physical work loses relevance because it can be delegated to robots and avatars. In the decentralized system of Synchronomy, every person has equal value. This means, that every single one of us is responsible for the well-being of the economy and the welfare of society. “Synchronomy is only possible if people have a high level of education and recognize their social, political and economic responsibility.” Individuals need to be willing to reflect on personal and social goals as well as on their identities. There are three hurdles in the way of realizing the ideas of Synchronomy. The first one is the educational system. It should promote the individuality as well as the self-reflection of those learning and accompany people over their entire lives. The second hurdle is the mistaken belief that the mass is always right. Structures that make the implementation of self-defeating ideas harder need to be created. The third hurdle is overcoming the monetary system. Synchronomy is a modern exchange economy; it should return to a system of reciprocal exchange.

Measuring systems of today, most importantly GDP, measure success according to the principles and goals of Economy 2.0. In new economic systems, we need new indicators to evaluate the prosperity and well-being of states. Instead of only measuring quantitative indicators like financial profit, emotional indicators like the happiness and the health of a society should be integrated into our calculations of success.

33 Thesis
Based on the Economy 3.0, Fiechter developed 33 theses for the digital age. These theses are addressed to creative sense workers who want to live consciously and environmentally friendly:

1. Economy’s objective is the satisfaction of our needs.2. We all are at the heart of economy. A large part of our everyday lives is about economic actions, be it as consumer, as employee of a company, as shareholder at the stock exchange or as part of the community that defines the political parameters of the economy.3. In order to get the economic system up and running, it needs us as we perform the central functions of the economic system together on a daily basis.4. Bit by bit, the winners and losers of our economic system become apparent.5. The capitalistic system is in a big crisis, having not yet found the road towards renewal. 6. Due to its maximization approach, the guild of economists bears the responsibility that economy has dehumanized and disconnected from our needs.7. Nowadays, economic theory does not correspond with our perceived reality at all.8. Current riots around the globe are one result thereof.9. We are all asked to change economy.10. It is up to us to improve economy and there by improve the living conditions of millions of people. 11. Economy has not dropped from the sky. It is no natural phenomenon against which we as humans are powerless.12. We believe that it is our collective emotions that form the economic system. 13. The creative control over the development of economic theories shall no longer rest with the competence of academies, chairs and elites. 14. We are the power. We must only think from a common point of view as a WE and no longer rely on the leaders of this world. 15. The leaders need us more than we need them.16. The new Economy 3.0 establishes a new system of thought and values, which allows us greater freedom but, on the other hand, more social responsibility.17. Pure transaction oriented mass consumption will decrease. We will buy more products that precisely correspond to our identity. 18. The internet is developing new rules and thereby creates new winners and new losers. 19. We respect the following four rules: I. reflect yourself II. network yourself III. share your knowledge IV. participate at decentralized control options.20. The network helps us to better reflect about us and our needs by means of a dialog with others. 21. The network helps to bring our needs in line with the companies’ value propositions.22. Social networks like Facebook, Twitter, YouTube, and others increase the ability to influence, to actively participate and join in the discussion again. We have regained the autonomy over economic processes that have previously been controlled by the companies.23. The internet fully involves us and makes us participants.24. We do not want any ready-made matters any more.25. We do not need anybody who explains the world to us; we rather want to play an active role in the development of our consumer products. 26. We ask to be involved and to co-design something actively instead of consuming passively.27. Social networks are about to break up the structures of our capitalistic system step by step.28. CEOs and managers underestimate the political power of social affairs of in the internet.29. New types of consumption will be created that put emphasis on the use and functions of a product and less emphasis on its material possession.30. Once use has become more important than possession, money will lose its impact and as a consequence, social power structures will change fundamentally.31. We are living in a kind of twilight zone in which the battle for the future is raging. We are witnessing the struggle between the forces of centralization and decentralization.32. Large companies and established organizations have a hard time finding the right approach to get us involved.33. There is no question whether the revolution is about to begin or not; the question is how we are going to face it: anarchy or structured change.''

Bibliography
 “We are the Economy! The Emergence of a New Social Order in the Age of the Freelance Economy”. Stämpfli Verlag AG (2012). ASIN: B00B9MTS7Y 
 “Rise of the Digital Tribal Society”. Neue Zürcher Zeitung NZZ Libro (2016).

See also
 Clinton Global Initiative

References

1972 births
Living people
20th-century Swiss  economists
21st-century Swiss economists
Argentine emigrants to Switzerland